James Naylor (2 March 1901 – 1983) was an English professional footballer who played for Oldham Athletic, Huddersfield Town, Newcastle United, Manchester City and Macclesfield. He made only one appearance for Manchester City, against Middlesbrough on 7 January 1933, when he deputised for Jackie Bray. He was born in High Crompton, Lancashire.

References

Mention of Jimmy Naylor's death
 Newcastle United data taken from www.nufc.com

1901 births
1983 deaths
People from Shaw and Crompton
English footballers
Footballers from Oldham
Association football defenders
Oldham Athletic A.F.C. players
Huddersfield Town A.F.C. players
Manchester City F.C. players
Newcastle United F.C. players
Macclesfield Town F.C. players
English Football League players
FA Cup Final players